Gymnothorax punctatofasciatus is a moray eel found in coral reefs in the Pacific and Indian Oceans. It was first named by Pieter Bleeker in 1863, and is commonly known as the bars'n spots moray.

References

punctatofasciatus
Fish described in 1863